Polygala japonica is a species of flowering plant in the milkwort family (Polygalaceae). It is native to Northeast, East and Southeastern Asia, as well as eastern Australia. Its stems have tiny curled hairs. It flowers between October and December.

References

japonica